TR Property Investment Trust is a large British investment trust dedicated to investments in the property sector. Established in 1905, the company is a constituent of the FTSE 250 Index. It is managed by Thames River Capital LLP.

References

External links 
 

Investment trusts of the United Kingdom
1905 establishments in England
Financial services companies established in 1905
British companies established in 1905
Companies listed on the London Stock Exchange